Loris is the common name for the strepsirrhine mammals of the subfamily Lorinae.

Loris may also refer to:

Mammals
 Loris (genus) or slender loris, a genus comprising two species
 Slow lorises, in the genus Nycticebus
 Pygmy slow loris, in the genus Xanthonycticebus

Places
 Loris, South Carolina, a city in South Carolina

People
 Hugo von Hofmannsthal (1874–1929), writer, early pen name Loris
 Loris Abate (1928–2020), Italian jewelry designer and businessman
 Loris Azzaro (1933–2003), French-Italian fashion designer
 Loris Baz (born 1993), French motorcycle racer
 Loris Benito (born 1992), Swiss footballer
 Loris Campana (1926–2015), Italian road bicycle and track cyclist
 Loris Capirossi (born 1973), Italian Grand Prix motorcycle road racer
 Loris Facci (born 1983), Italian swimmer
 Loris Fortuna (1924–1985), Italian politician
 Loris Kessel (1950–2010), Swiss racing driver
 Loris Karius (born 1993), German footballer
 Loris Francesco Capovilla (1915–2016), Italian Roman Catholic prelate and cardinal
 Loris Reggiani (born 1959), Italian motorcycle racer
 Loris Stecca (born 1960), Italian world champion boxer
 Loris Tjeknavorian (born 1937), Iranian-Armenian composer and conductor

See also
 Lory (disambiguation)
 Lorry (disambiguation)
 Lori (disambiguation)
 Hugo Lloris (born 1986), French footballer